"Autumn in New York" is a jazz standard and popular song composed by Vernon Duke in Westport, Connecticut in the summer of 1934.  It was written without a commission or for a specific show, but Duke offered it to producer Murray Anderson for his Broadway musical Thumbs Up!. The play opened on December 27, 1934 where the song was performed by singer J. Harold Murray.

Many versions of the song have been recorded over the years by numerous musicians and singers. The only version to achieve chart success as a single in the USA was that by Frank Sinatra, which reached No. 27 in 1949. Jazz versions have been performed by The Hi Lo's, Charlie Parker, Billie Holiday, Bing Crosby, Mary Lou Williams, Stan Kenton, Sarah Vaughan, Sheila Jordan, Bill Evans, Tal Farlow, Ahmad Jamal, Buddy De Franco, Salvador Sobral, Al Haig, Diana Krall, and a duet version by Scottish singers Todd Gordon and Carol Kidd. The song was also recorded by Jo Stafford, and by Louis Armstrong and Ella Fitzgerald as a duet.

See also

List of 1930s jazz standards

References

External links 
Song information at JazzStandards.com

1930s jazz standards
1934 songs
Louis Armstrong songs
Ella Fitzgerald songs
Frank Sinatra songs
Songs with music by Vernon Duke
Jo Stafford songs
Songs about New York City